Bimal Thapa is a Bhutanese politician who has been a member of the National Assembly of Bhutan, since October 2018.

Education
He holds a Bachelor of Science in Information Technology degree from RVS College of Arts and Science, India.

Political career
Before joining politics, he was a farmer.

He was elected to the National Assembly of Bhutan as a candidate of DNT from Kilkhorthang-Mendrelgang constituency in 2018 Bhutanese National Assembly election. He received 6,681 votes and defeated Yangku Tshering Sherpa, a candidate of DPT.

References 

1986 births
Living people
Bhutanese MNAs 2018–2023
Druk Nyamrup Tshogpa politicians
Bhutanese farmers
Bhutanese people of Nepalese descent
Druk Nyamrup Tshogpa MNAs